Without Regret is a 1935 American drama film directed by Harold Young and starring Elissa Landi, Paul Cavanagh and Frances Drake. It also features an early appearance by David Niven.

It was based on the play Interference the British writers  Roland Pertwee and Harold Dearden which had previously been turned into a 1928 silent film of the same title. The film was released on September 13, 1935, by Paramount Pictures.

Premise
After returning to England and unwittingly committing bigamy, a young woman is threatened with blackmail.

Main cast  
Elissa Landi as Jennifer Gage
Paul Cavanagh as Robert Godfrey
Frances Drake as Mona Gould
Kent Taylor as Steven Paradin
Gilbert Emery as Inspector Hayes
David Niven as Bill Gage
 Forrester Harvey as Police Surgeon  
 Peter Hobbes as Fred 
 Viva Tattersall as Vera

References

Bibliography
 Monaco, James. The Encyclopedia of Film. Perigee Books, 1991.
 Munn, Michael. David Niven: The Man Behind the Balloon. Aurum Press, 2014.

External links 
 

1935 films
1930s English-language films
Paramount Pictures films
American drama films
1935 drama films
American black-and-white films
Films directed by Harold Young (director)
Films set in England
American films based on plays
Remakes of American films
Films set in London
1930s American films